Shri Kali Devi Temple is a temple in Patiala, Punjab, India. It was built by the Maharaja of Patiala in 1936. The Maharaja was inspired to build the temple and bring the six-foot-tall statues of Maa Kali and Paawan Jyot from Bengal to Patiala. Today, the temple is situated opposite the Baradari Gardens. 

Shri Kali Devi is a kul devi of many people. During the Navratras, the temple has many visitors over the course of nine days.

External links 

 Official website of Shri Kali Devi Temple

References

Devi temples in India
Hindu temples in Punjab, India